Akri is a village and a community of the Elassona municipality. Before the 2011 local government reform it was part of the municipality of Antichasia, of which it was a municipal district. The 2011 census recorded 191 inhabitants in the village. The community of Akri covers an area of 58.354 km2.

Population
According to the 2011 census, the population of the settlement of Akri was 191 people, almost the same with the population of the previous census of 2001.

See also
 List of settlements in the Larissa regional unit

References

Populated places in Larissa (regional unit)